A gargoyle is a grotesque statue.

Gargoyle may also refer to:

 Gargoyle (monster), a type of fantasy and horror monster

Books and publications
Gargoyles (novel), a 1967 novel by Thomas Bernhard
The Gargoyle (novel), a 2008 novel by Andrew Davidson
The Gargoyle (newspaper), a University of Toronto newspaper
Gargoyle Humor Magazine, a University of Michigan magazine
Gargoyle Magazine, a Washington (D.C.) literary journal
Gargoyles (comics), a 2006 comic book series from Slave Labor Graphics
Gargoyle (comics), a Marvel Comics character

Film and television 
Gargoyle, a character in the anime series Nadia: The Secret of Blue Water
Gargoyles (TV series), an animated series that ran from 1994 to 1997
Gargoyles (TV film), a 1972 TV film directed by Bill Norton
Gargoyle: Wings of Darkness, a 2004 horror film

Games 
Gargoyle (module), a Dungeons & Dragons module
Gargoyles (video game), a 1996 video game
Gargoyle Games, a British software company successful in the 1980s
Gargoyle (Champions character) a superhero in the Champions role-playing game and some spin-off League of Champions comics

Music 
Gargoyle (band), a Japanese thrash metal band
Gargoyle (album), a 2017 album by American singer Mark Lanegan
Gargoyles (Liebermann), a 1989 suite for solo piano
"The Gargoyle", a song by Paul Gilbert from the 2008 album Silence Followed By A Deafening Roar
"Gargoyle", a song by The ILYs from the 2017 album Bodyguard
"Gargoyle", song by Dinosaur Jr. from the 2010 album Download to Donate for Haiti

Other uses 
LBD Gargoyle, a World War Two guided bomb
Gargoyle, the NATO reporting name for the S-300PMU-1/2 (SA-20) anti-aircraft missile system
Gargoyle (router firmware), an OpenWrt-based router firmware
The Gargoyles, two mountain peaks in British Columbia, Canada

See also
Hurler syndrome, once known as "Gargoylism"
Gargouille, a dragon